The governor of Nenets Autonomous Okrug is the head of the executive branch of the Nenets Autonomous Okrug, a federal subject of Russia located in the north-west of the country's European part. The Governor is elected by the Assembly of Deputies of Nenets Autonomous Okrug for a term of five years.

History of office 
On 30 November 1991, the first deputy Chairman of Naryan-Mar Executive Committee Yury Komarovsky was appointed Head of Administration of Nenets Autonomous Okrug by the decree of the President of Russia Boris Yeltsin. In February 1996, Komarovsky was removed from his post by a decree of the President of Russia. The resignation was caused by a conflict with the Assembly of Deputies, which accused Komarovsky of misappropriating budget funds.

Member of the Assembly Vladimir Khabarov was appointed new head of administration. In December 1996 he lost the election to entrepreneur Vladimir Butov. Butov was re-elected in 2001. Four years later Alexey Barinov was elected 4th head of administration of NAO. These were the last gubernatorial elections in Russia until October 2012 due to major legislation change imposed by president Vladimir Putin in late 2004.

In September 2014 Nenets AO hold its fourth gubernatorial elections. Igor Koshin, who came second in 2005 race, was elected new governor of the Okrug. Five months later the Assembly of Deputies decided to returh back to 2005–2012 scheme, in which instead of direct elections, the governor is endowed with powers by the Assembly. Deputies choose from three candidates proposed by the President of Russia. But now the governor of Arkhangelsk Oblast also takes participation in the formation of the list of candidates for governor of NAO. As speaker Anatoly Myandin said, "the abolition of direct elections for the governor and the transition to a new system will strengthen relations between the two regions."

List of office-holders

Timeline

Notes

References 

Politics of Nenets Autonomous Okrug
 
Nenets